Orsillinae is a subfamily of seed bugs in the family Lygaeidae. There are at least 110 described species in Orsillinae; the type genus is Orsillus.

Genera
 Belonochilus Uhler, 1871
 Glyptonysius Usinger, 1942
 Metrarga White, 1878
 Neortholomus Hamilton, 1983
 Neseis Kirkaldy, 1900
 Nesoclimacias Kirkaldy, 1908
 Nesocryptias Kirkaldy, 1908
 Nesomartis Kirkaldy, 1907
 Nysius Dallas, 1852 (false chinch bugs)
 Oceanides Kirkaldy, 1910
 Orsillus Dallas, 1852
 Xyonysius Ashlock & Lattin, 1963

References

 Henry, Thomas J. (1997). "Phylogenetic Analysis of Family Groups within the Infraorder Pentatomomorpha (Hemiptera: Heteroptera), with Emphasis on the Lygaeoidea". Annals of the Entomological Society of America, vol. 90, no. 3, 275–301.
 Thomas J. Henry, Richard C. Froeschner. (1988). Catalog of the Heteroptera, True Bugs of Canada and the Continental United States. Brill Academic Publishers.

Further reading

External links

 NCBI Taxonomy Browser, Orsillinae

Lygaeidae